The 2022–23 NC State Wolfpack women's basketball team represented North Carolina State University during the 2022–23 NCAA Division I women's basketball season. The Wolfpack are led by tenth-year head coach Wes Moore and play their home games at Reynolds Coliseum as members of the Atlantic Coast Conference.

Previous season

The Wolfpack finished the season 32–4 overall and 17–1 in ACC play to finish as regular season champions.  As the first seed in the ACC tournament, they earned a bye to the Quarterfinals where they defeated ninth seed Florida State, then they defeated fifth seed Virginia Tech in the Semifinals, and they won the Final versus seven seed Miami to win their third straight tournament title.  As champions, they earned the ACC's automatic bid to the NCAA tournament where they were the first seed in the Bridgeport Region.  They defeated sixteen seed Longwood in the First Round, ninth seed Kansas State in the Second Round, and fifth seed Notre Dame in the Sweet Sixteen before losing to second seed UConn in the Elite Eight to end their season.

Off-season

Departures

Incoming Transfers

Recruiting Class

NC State did not have any Freshman join the team in the 2022–23 season.

Roster

Schedule

Source

|-
!colspan=6 style=| Exhibition

|-
!colspan=6 style=| Non-Conference Regular season

|-
!colspan=6 style=| ACC Regular season

|-
!colspan=6 style=| ACC Tournament

|-
!colspan=6 style=| NCAA Tournament

Rankings

AP does not release a final poll.

References

NC State Wolfpack women's basketball seasons
NC State
NC State Wolfpack women's basketball team
NC State Wolfpack women's basketball team
NC State